Silas Lima Malafaia (14 September 1958) is a Brazilian Pentecostal pastor, author and televangelist, who also has a degree in Psychology. He is the leader of the Pentecostal church Assembleia de Deus Vitória em Cristo (Assembly of God Victory in Christ), a branch of the broader Assembleias de Deus movement of Pentecostal churches in Brazil. He is also the CEO of the  publishing company, and vice president of the Interdenominational Council of Evangelical Ministers of Brazil (CIMEB), which is made up of approximately 8.500 ministers and leaders from almost all Brazilian evangelical denominations.

Malafaia was born in Rio de Janeiro. He is well known for his political work and strong opposition to the promotion of homosexuality in society and Abortion Law, as well as for defending the Prosperity theology. In the elections of 2012, he was the evangelical political canvasser of the candidate José Serra to the city council of São Paulo and helped to elect 24 mayors and 16 city councilmen in seven states. In the elections of 2014, Malafaia campaigned for Aécio Neves to the Presidency of Brazil. In the 2018 election Malafaia endorsed eventual winner Jair Bolsonaro.

According to a 2013 Forbes magazine publication, his total net worth is estimated at US$150 million. However, he denied the information in the talkshow , in which he affirmed that his wealth revolved around R$6 million (approximately US$1.6 million).

Viewed as a staunch conservative, Malafaia is a polarizing and controversial figure in Brazil. He is often accused of fomenting hate speech, being known for his strong opposition to same-sex marriage and abortion. His critics accuse him of being a bigot and a homophobe, which he denies.

List of publications

References 

1958 births
Living people
Brazilian Assemblies of God pastors
Brazilian anti-communists
Brazilian anti-same-sex-marriage activists
Brazilian evangelicals
Brazilian Pentecostals
Brazilian television evangelists
Christian religious leaders in Brazil
Brazilian anti-abortion activists
Conservatism in Brazil
Protestantism in Brazil
Prosperity theologians